Statistics of Belgian First Division in the 1947–48 season.

Overview

It was contested by 16 teams, and KV Mechelen won the championship.

League standings

Results

References

Belgian Pro League seasons
1947–48 in Belgian football
Belgian